The 2019 Atlanta United FC season was the third season of Atlanta United FC's existence, and the eleventh year that a professional soccer club from Atlanta, Georgia competed in the top division of American soccer. Atlanta United played their home matches at Mercedes-Benz Stadium. Outside of MLS, the team made their first appearance in the CONCACAF Champions League and the Campeones Cup (beating Club América to become the first MLS team to win the latter) and won the 2019 U.S. Open Cup by beating Minnesota United 2–1. This marked the team's first year without former head coach Gerardo "Tata" Martino, who was replaced with Frank de Boer.

Club

International roster slots 

Atlanta had seven International Roster Slots for use at the end of the season. José Hernández did not occupy an international slot while he was on loan to Atlanta United 2. Julian Gressel and Gordon Wild received green cards in May, making them domestic players for MLS roster purposes. On July 1, Atlanta traded an international slot to FC Dallas until the end of the 2020 season as part of a package for Emerson Hyndman's discovery rights. On August 21, Luiz Fernando was added to the senior team roster, occupying Atlanta's last international slot.

Results

Non-competitive

Friendlies

Competitive

Major League Soccer

League tables

Eastern Conference

Overall

Results summary

Results by round

Matches

MLS Cup Playoffs

U.S. Open Cup

CONCACAF Champions League

Campeones Cup

Statistics

Appearances and goals

|-
! colspan=16 style=background:#dcdcdc; text-align:center|Goalkeepers

|-
! colspan=16 style=background:#dcdcdc; text-align:center|Defenders

|-
! colspan=16 style=background:#dcdcdc; text-align:center|Midfielders

|-
! colspan=16 style=background:#dcdcdc; text-align:center|Forwards

|-
! colspan=16 style=background:#dcdcdc; text-align:center|Players who have played for Atlanta United this season but have left the club:

|}

Top scorers

Disciplinary record

Player movement

In

SuperDraft picks 
Draft picks are not automatically signed to the team roster. Only trades involving draft picks and executed after the start of 2019 MLS SuperDraft will be listed in the notes. Atlanta had three selections in the draft, but declined to use their fourth round pick.

Loan in

Out

Loan out

Non-player transfers

Honors

Weekly / monthly

MLS player of the month

MLS team / player / coach of the week

MLS goal of the week

Annual

References

Atlanta United FC seasons
Atlanta United
Atlanta United
Atlanta United FC
Atlanta
2019